Lesbian, gay, bisexual, and transgender (LGBT) people in Paraná, Brazil enjoy many of the same legal protections available to non-LGBT people. Homosexuality is legal in the state.

Same-sex marriage
In 2004, the first case of recognition of same-sex unions in Brazil occurred with a binational Englishman and a Brazilian. This legal precedent encouraged other couples to marry around the country. At the time of the ceremony, in the form of common-law marriage, this was a status that, until then, was only granted to opposite-sex couples. The couple had lived together for fourteen years, in the Brazilian city of Curitiba.

On 26 March 2013, the Corregedor Geral de Justiça of Paraná ruled that same-sex marriage and conversion of the stable unions to marriage should be possible using the normal marriage procedures.

LGBT adoption
May 14, 2009 − a gay couple was the first to win in court the right of adoption in the Brazilian State of Paraná. A decision of the 2nd Court of Childhood, Youth and Adoption, changed the life of a homosexual couple who live in Curitiba. Two years previously, the gay couple had attempted to adopt a child. They had their request granted by a judge who ruled that the couple were living in a stable and affectionate union, and were able to raise a child of either sex and age in a healthy environment.

October 27, 2010 − the Justice of the city of Cascavel, Paraná, authorized the adoption of an eight-year-old child with cerebral palsy by a gay couple who had been living together for twelve years. The authorization is irreversible, according to Judge Sergio Luiz Kreuz, who granted the application for adoption based on the decision of the Superior Court of Justice.

September 16, 2011 - the Justice of the city of Maringá, Paraná authorized the adoption of two children by a lesbian couple.

Gender reassignment

References

Parana
Paraná (state)